William McKnight Russell (born 14 September 1959) is a Scottish former footballer who previously worked as Centre of Excellence Manager at Hull City, where he has been caretaker manager on three occasions.

As a player, he was a defender, playing for Everton, Celtic, Doncaster Rovers, Scunthorpe United and Rotherham United, making over 450 league appearances.

Honours
Doncaster Rovers
Football League Fourth Division runner-up: 1983–84

Rotherham United
Football League Fourth Division: 1988–89

Individual
PFA Team of the Year: 1988–89 Fourth Division

References

External links

1959 births
Living people
Footballers from Glasgow
Scottish footballers
Association football fullbacks
Everton F.C. players
Celtic F.C. players
Doncaster Rovers F.C. players
Scunthorpe United F.C. players
Rotherham United F.C. players
Scottish football managers
Hull City A.F.C. managers
English Football League players
Scotland youth international footballers
Association football coaches